Grüner See is a lake in the Wiehen Hills of the Osnabrück Landkreis in Lower Saxony, Germany. It is around 25km north of Bielefeld. 

Lakes of Lower Saxony
LGruner See
Wiehen Hills
Waterfalls of Germany